COSL may refer to:

 Credit ombudsman service Limited, an External/Alternate Dispute Resolution Scheme in Australia
 China Oilfield Services, a Chinese petroleum services company
 Luxembourgian Olympic and Sporting Committee, Luxembourg's National Olympic Committee
 Citicorp Overseas Software Limited, Citicorp Overseas Software Limited, Mumbai, India. This was the origin of current 'Oracle Financial Services'